Kwon Wan-kyu (born 20 November 1991) is a South Korean footballer who plays as full-back for FC Seoul.

Career
He was selected by Gyeongnam FC in the 2014 K League draft.

References

External links 

1991 births
Living people
Association football fullbacks
South Korean footballers
Gyeongnam FC players
Incheon United FC players
Pohang Steelers players
Gimcheon Sangmu FC players
Seongnam FC players
FC Seoul players
K League 1 players
Sungkyunkwan University alumni